Fazael Tadayon (1908 – 7 February 1976) was a full general at the Pahlavi Iran's air force and served as the chief of the staff of the Imperial Iranian Air Force. He was made the commander of the air force on 13 September 1975 replacing Mohammad Amir Khatami who died a day before in a kiting accident. Tadayon's tenure was brief and lasted until 1976 when he was killed in a helicopter accident. He was succeeded by Amir Hossein Rabii as the chief of Imperial Iranian Air Force.

References

External links

1908 births
1976 deaths
Commanders of Imperial Iranian Air Force
Imperial Iranian Armed Forces four-star generals
People of Pahlavi Iran
Victims of aviation accidents or incidents in Iran